Scott Anthony Smith (born 29 September 1972) is a former speedway rider from England.

Speedway career 
Smith reached the final of the British Speedway Championship in 1997. He rode in the top tier of British Speedway from 1990 to 2009, riding for various clubs. In addition to reaching the British Final he was crowned British Junior Champion in 1992.

References 

Living people
1972 births
British speedway riders
Berwick Bandits riders
Cradley Heathens riders
Exeter Falcons riders
Sheffield Tigers riders
Stoke Potters riders
Workington Comets riders
Sportspeople from Sheffield